Sixtyfive Cadillac — High Energy Soul Show (or 65 Cadillac) is a ten-piece rhythm 'n' blues big band from Walsrode (Lower Saxony, Germany).

History 
Sixtyfive Cadillac was founded in 1990. After preliminary rehearsals in June the group played their first concert on August 25, 1990, for over a five hundred fans in legendary “Welcome” club in Hützel north of Soltau, Germany.

More than six hundred concerts in Germany, Luxembourg, and Poland have followed, as well as numerous radio and TV appearances till now.

Members 
 Heiko Ebeling, Walsrode (Germany), vocals and harp
 Malte Kadel, Walsrode (Germany), vocals
 Shan Gao, Shenyang, China, alto sax and flute
 Dirk Riedstra, Hilversum (Netherlands), tenor sax
 Georg Weisbrodt, Ruppertsberg (Germany), trombone
 Andreas Petalas, Drama (Greece), guitar and vocals
 Rolf Mäusbacher, Cologne (Germany), guitar and vocals
 Damian Galinski, Tczew, Poland, keyboards
 Michael Schrant, Haselünne (Germany), drums
 Walter Kohn, Walsrode (Germany), bass

Discography

Studio albums 
 Sixtyfive Cadillac, (Like It Is Records, LII 098001) (1998)
 2, (Like It Is Records, LII 002001) (2002)
 Five Songs, (Like It Is Records, LII 012001) (2012)

Sampler CDs 
 10 Jahre Blues-Matinee Garbsen (1 Track), 2009

Gallery

Bibliography 
 Matthias Blazek: Das niedersächsische Bandkompendium 1963-2003 – Daten und Fakten von 100 Rockgruppen aus Niedersachsen, Celle 2006,

External links 

 www.sixtyfive-cadillac.de – Official Website
 Facebook page
 Instagram channel
 YouTube channel
 YouTube archive channel
 Soundcloud
 Band History

Big bands
German funk musical groups
German contemporary R&B musical groups
German soul musical groups